Soľ  is a village and municipality in Vranov nad Topľou District in the Prešov Region of eastern Slovakia. It is one of the oldest villages in eastern Slovakia.

History
The land that is now Sol' was the location of intermittent human settlements ranging from the Stone Age to the foundation of Sol' itself. It was likely settled because of its advantageous position.

The village was first mentioned in 1252. Its name, Sol', which is Slovak for salt, comes from the three salt water springs which are in the vicinity of the village. The salt from the springs was used to salt foods until the beginning of World War I.

In the summer of 1831, the village suffered a cholera outbreak which was followed by a large peasant uprising.

The village had a sizable Jewish community in the 1800s, which had its own synagogue and may have had a religious school.

Geography
The municipality lies at an altitude of 140 metres and covers an area of 10.286 km².

Population
The village has a population of about 2,293.

Economy and infrastructure

Transportation
The village has a railroad station in the outskirts, and a bus stop in the center of the village.

Education
There is a school in the village which serves Soľ and some surrounding villages. The school had an enrollment of 521 5-9 graders in the 2005/2006 school year. The school itself contains two buildings; an older building built in 1957, and a newer addition built in 1975.

There is also a kindergarten with 65 students (as of the 2005/2006 school year).

Politics
Joseph Berta has served as mayor of Sol' since 1994.

Notable residents

 Jakob Jakobeus, a famous Slovak poet, historian, writer, and Protestant priest, lived in Sol' from 1626 to 1629. He served as pastor of the village during his stay and he wrote a collection of Latin poetry.

References

External links
 
 

Villages and municipalities in Vranov nad Topľou District
Cities and towns in Slovakia